Posey Island State Park is a popular recreation area consisting of  Posey Island in San Juan County, Washington. The island-park is managed by the Washington State Parks and Recreation Commission. It became a state park in 1960 under lease from the U.S. Bureau of Land Management.

References

External links

Posey Island State Park Washington State Parks and Recreation Commission

Parks in San Juan County, Washington
State parks of Washington (state)
San Juan Islands
Uninhabited islands of Washington (state)